"Love Song" is a single by English punk rock band the Damned, released in April 1979. It was the first fruit of the reformed lineup's deal with Chiswick Records, boosted by four variant picture sleeves, each one featuring a member of the band, with an additional 20,000 copies pressed on red vinyl (5,000 for each sleeve). Combined with radio airplay and a catchy song, this yielded the Damned's first hit, peaking at No. 20 in the UK Singles Chart, and leading to the band's debut on Top of the Pops.

"Love Song" was included on the band's third album, Machine Gun Etiquette, and was referenced in the album's title track.

In February 1982, Chiswick reissued the single on their Big Beat imprint, using only the covers featuring Dave Vanian, Captain Sensible and Rat Scabies (Algy Ward having left the band by this stage).

The single was also issued in France, Germany and the Netherlands.

Track listing
All songs written by Scabies, Sensible, Vanian, Ward.
 "Love Song"  - 2:03
 "Noise Noise Noise"  - 3:10
 "Suicide" - 3:14

Production credits
Producers
 Ed Hollis

Musicians
 Dave Vanian − vocals
 Captain Sensible − guitar
 Rat Scabies − drums
 Algy Ward − bass

References

External links

1979 singles
1982 singles
The Damned (band) songs
Songs written by David Vanian
Songs written by Rat Scabies
Songs written by Captain Sensible
Songs written by Algy Ward
1979 songs
Chiswick Records singles